Velzeboer is a Dutch surname.

People with this surname:
 Mark Velzeboer (born 1968), Dutch short track speed skater
 Monique Velzeboer (born 1969), Dutch short track speed skater
 Simone Velzeboer (born 1967), Dutch short track speed skater
 Xandra Velzeboer (born 2001), Dutch short track speed skater

Dutch-language surnames
nl:Velzeboer